"Soft Kitty" is a children's song, popularized by the characters Sheldon and Penny in the American sitcom The Big Bang Theory, and which elsewhere may be rendered as "Warm Kitty". A 2015 copyright lawsuit alleged the words to "Warm Kitty" were written by Edith Newlin; however, the lawsuit was dismissed because the court found that the plaintiffs failed to show they had a valid claim.
 
In The Big Bang Theory, the song is described by Sheldon as a song sung by his mother when he is ill. The lyrics on The Big Bang Theory are: "Soft kitty, warm kitty, little ball of fur! Happy kitty, sleepy kitty, purr purr purr!" A scene in an episode of Young Sheldon, the prequel series to The Big Bang Theory, depicts the origin of the song. This aired on February 1, 2018, and shows Sheldon's mother Mary singing the song to her son, who is suffering with the flu.

Versions of the song have been released by Australian children's performer Patsy Biscoe, and by the long-running ABC children's program Play School—a recording sung by Philip Quast and Barbara Frawley was released on the show's 1993 album The Best of Play School, which predates The Big Bang Theory and has the lyrics reversed, instead going: "Warm kitty, soft kitty, little ball of fur. Sleepy kitty, happy kitty, purr purr purr." The song remains part of Play Schools catalog of children's songs regularly performed on the program: the show's presenters occasionally perform the song for their young viewers.

Copyright lawsuit
In December 2015, the heirs of Edith Newlin filed a lawsuit against the various companies associated with The Big Bang Theory, claiming that the words and music to the song appeared in the book Songs for the Nursery School published in 1937 by Willis Music Company, based on a poem by Newlin; the copyright to the book was renewed in 1964. 
The website for Willis Music states: 

The suit by Newlin's daughters, on the other hand, claimed that they held the copyright. Furthermore, they alleged that they did not authorize the use of the lyrics, that Willis Music did not have permission to authorize others to use the lyrics, and that the lyrics had been used not only in the television series but on various kinds of program-associated merchandise without proper permission.

On March 27, 2017, US District Court Judge Naomi Reice Buchwald dismissed the suit, holding that the plaintiffs had not shown that they held a copyright on their mother's lyrics: "They have failed to establish that they own a valid copyright as necessary to state a copyright infringement claim."

References 

Singing games
The Big Bang Theory
Cats in literature
American nursery rhymes
American children's songs
Songs about cats
Songs from television series